This is a list of high school athletic conferences in the Central Region of Ohio, as defined by the OHSAA. Because the names of localities and their corresponding high schools do not always match and because there is often a possibility of ambiguity with respect to either the name of a locality or the name of a high school, the following table gives both in every case, with the locality name first, in plain type, and the high school name second in boldface type. The school's team nickname is given last.

Central Catholic League
 Columbus Bishop Hartley Hawks (1957-)
 Columbus Bishop Watterson Eagles (1955-)
 Columbus St. Charles Cardinals (1923-)
 Columbus St. Francis DeSales Stallions (1960-)
Departing Division Member
 Columbus Bishop Ready Silver Knights (1960-2023) (Fall 2023 Bishop Ready will join Central Buckeye League) 

Former members
 Columbus Holy Family Golden Flashes (1928–60)
 Columbus Holy Rosary Ramblers (1928–66, consolidated into Father Wehrle)
 Newark Catholic Green Wave (1928-53 as St. Francis, 1991-2003)
 Columbus St. MaryRams (1928–66, consolidated into Father Wehrle)
 Zanesville St. Nicholas Flyers (1928–50, consolidated into Bishop Rosecrans)
 Zanesville St. Thomas Aquinas Irish (1928–44, 1946–50, consolidated into Bishop Rosecrans)
 Mount Vernon St. Vincent De Paul Blue Streaks (1928–53)
 Zanesville Bishop Rosecrans Bishops (1950–77, 1979-2007)
 Springfield Catholic Central Fighting Irish (1951–53)
 Lancaster St. Mary Saints (1951–53)
 Marion St. Mary Fighting Irish (1951–53)
 New Lexington St. Aloysius Blue Knights (1955-1969)
 Columbus Father Wehrle Wolverines (1966–91, school closed)
 Columbus Worthington Christian High School Warriors (2007–13)
 Columbus Columbus School for Girls Unicorns (1988-2019, left for the Mid-State League)

Columbus City League
North Division
 Columbus Beechcroft Cougars (1976-)
 Columbus Centennial Stars (1976-)
 Columbus East Tigers (1924-)
 Columbus Linden McKinley Panthers (1928-)
 Columbus North International Lions (2010-)
 Columbus Mifflin Punchers (1973-)
 Columbus Northland Vikings (1965-)
 Columbus Whetstone Braves (1961-)

South Division
 Columbus Africentric Nubians (1999-)
 Columbus Briggs Bruins (1962-)
 Columbus Eastmoor Academy Warriors (1956-)
 Columbus Independence 76ers (1976-)
 Columbus Marion-Franklin Red Devils (1958-)
 Columbus South Bulldogs (1922-)
 Columbus Walnut Ridge Scots (1961-)
 Columbus West Cowboys (1922-)

Former members

 Columbus Central Pirates (1922-1982)
 Columbus North Polar Bears (1924-1979)
 Columbus Mohawk Indians (1967–1978)
 Columbus Brookhaven Bearcats (1963-2014)
 Columbus Aquinas College Terriers (1922-1965)

Independents

Former Members
 Powell Village Academy Griffins (School closed in 2019)

Knox-Morrow Athletic Conference

Started in 2017-18, the league was founded by members of the Mid-Ohio Athletic Conference's Blue Division.

 Cardington-Lincoln Pirates (2017-)
 Centerburg Trojans (2017-)
 Danville Blue Devils (2017-)
 Howard East Knox Bulldogs (2017-)
 Fredericktown Freddies (2017-)
 Sparta Highland Fighting Scots (2017-)
 Mount Gilead Indians (2017-)
 Galion Northmor Golden Knights (2017-)

Licking County League
The league has two incarnations, the first lasting from 1927 to 1991. The second incarnation began 23 years later after travel and budget concerns brought together the ten schools that had made up league membership until 1986. The league is split into two divisions - Buckeye and Cardinal divisions.

Buckeye
 Granville Blue Aces (1927-1950, 1963-1991, 2013-) Colors: Blue and White
 Zanesville Blue Devils (2020-) Colors: Blue and White
 Pataskala Licking Heights Hornets (1927-1983, 2013-, changed name from Summit Station 1958) Colors: Maroon and Gold
 Newark Licking Valley Panthers (1959-1991, 2013-) Colors: Red, White and Blue
 Pataskala Watkins Memorial Warriors (1955-1991, 2013-) Colors: Black and Gold

Cardinal
 Heath Bulldogs (1964-1991, 2013-) Colors: Brown and White
 Johnstown-Monroe Johnnies (1927-1991, 2013-) Colors: Red and White
 Hebron Lakewood Lancers (1959-1991, 2013-) Colors: Red, White and Blue
 Newark Catholic Green Wave (1973-1991, 2013-) Colors: Green and White
 Johnstown Northridge Vikings (1963-1986, 2013-) Colors: Green and White
 Utica Redskins (1927-1991, 2013-) Colors: Red and Gray

Former members
 Alexandria Red Devils (1927-1962, renamed Northridge South 1960, consolidated into Northridge) Colors: Red and Black
 Etna Eagles (1927-1955, consolidated into Watkins Memorial) Colors: Green and white
 Hanover Panthers (1927-1959, renamed Hanover-Toboso 1934, consolidated into Licking Valley) Colors: Maroon and White
 Hartford Yellow Jackets (1927-1960, consolidated into Northridge North) Colors: Orange and Black
 Hebron Trailblazers (1927-1958, consolidated into Lynnwood-Jacksontown) Colors: blue and Gray
 Homer Blue Devils (1927-1962, renamed Northridge North 1960, consolidated into Northride) Colors: Blue and Gold
 Jacksontown Trojans (1927-1959, renamed Lynnwood-Jacksontown 1958, consolidated into Lakewood) Colors: Red and White
 Kirkersville Komets (1927-1955, consolidated into Watkins Memorial) Colors: Red and White
 Pataskala Blue Streaks (1927-1955, consolidated into Watkins Memorial) Colors: Blue and White
 Toboso (1927-1934, consolidated into Hanover-Toboso)

Mid-Ohio Athletic Conference

Conference Website: http://www.moacsports.com/MISC/home.htm

 Bellville Clear Fork Colts (2017-)
 Galion Tigers (2014-)
 Marion Pleasant Spartans (1990-)
 Caledonia River Valley Vikings (1990-)
 Marion Harding Presidents (2014- all sports, 2015- in football)
 Ontario Warriors (2017-)
 Shelby Whippets (2018-)

Former members
 Cardington-Lincoln Pirates (1990-2017, to Knox-Morrow Conference)
 Centerburg Trojans (2013–17, to Knox-Morrow Conference)
 Howard East Knox Bulldogs (2014–17, to Knox-Morrow Conference)
 Marion Elgin Comets (1990-2017, to Northwest Central Conference)
 Milford Center Fairbanks Panthers (2013–17, to Ohio Heritage Conference)
 Fredericktown Freddies (2013–17, to Knox-Morrow Conference)
 Sparta Highland Fighting Scots (1990-2017, to Knox-Morrow Conference)
 Plain City Jonathan Alder Pioneers (2013–17, to Central Buckeye Conference)
 Mount Gilead Indians (1990-2017, to Knox-Morrow Conference)
 Richwood North Union Wildcats (1990-2018, to Central Buckeye Conference, football competed in MOAC for 2018 season)
 Galion Northmor Golden Knights (1990-2017, to Knox-Morrow Conference)
 Morral Ridgedale Rockets (1990-2014)
 Upper Sandusky Rams (2014 football season only)
 Delaware Buckeye Valley Barons (1990-2019, to Mid-State League)

Mid-Ohio Christian Athletic League

 Columbus Tree of Life Christian Trojans
 Delaware Christian Eagles
 Granville Christian Academy Lions
 Groveport Madison Christian Eagles
 Pataskala Liberty Christian Eagles
 Plain City Shekinah Christian School Flames
 Westerville Northside Christian LionsFormer members Lancaster Fairfield Christian Academy KnightsGahanna Christian Academy Eagles
 Grove City Christian Eagles
Maranatha Christian Patriots

Mid-State LeagueBuckeye Division Amanda Amanda-Clearcreek Aces (Amanda Black Aces before 1960) (1958-)
 Carroll Bloom-Carroll Bulldogs (Carroll before 1968, 1958-)
 Circleville Tigers (1990-)
 Lancaster Fairfield Union Falcons (1957-)
 Columbus Hamilton Township Rangers (1981-)
 Baltimore Liberty Union Lions (1949-) 
 Circleville Logan Elm Braves (1973-)Departing Buckeye Division Member Ashville Teays Valley Vikings (1984-2024)Cardinal Division Sugar Grove Berne Union Rockets (1953-)
 Zanesville Bishop Rosecrans Bishops (2017-)
 Lancaster Fairfield Christian Academy Knights (2013-)
 Lancaster Fisher Catholic Irish (1964-)
 Grove City Christian Eagles (2013-)
 Canal Winchester Harvest Preparatory Warriors (2003-) (Football in Ohio Division)
 Corning Miller Falcons (2020-)
 Millersport Lakers (1957-)
 Columbus School for Girls Unicorns (2019-)
 Upper Arlington The Wellington School Jaguars (2017-) (No football)Ohio Division Bexley Lions (2003-)
 Columbus Bishop Ready Silver Knights (2017-) (Football only)
 Delaware Buckeye Valley Barons (2019-)
 Gahanna Columbus Academy Vikings (1949-1957, 2003-)
 Grandview Heights Bobcats (2003-)
 Whitehall-Yearling Rams (2003-)
 Worthington Christian Warriors (2013-) (Football in Cardinal Division)Former members Canal Winchester Indians (1957-1964, 1966-2012)
 Pickerington Tigers (1966-1981)
 Pataskala Licking Heights Hornets (1984-2012)
 New Albany Eagles (1990-2006)
 Granville Blue Aces (1991-2013)
 Heath Bulldogs (1991-2013)
 Hebron Lakewood Lancers (2003-2013)
 Newark Licking Valley Panthers (2003-2013)
 Newark Catholic Green Wave (2003-2013)
 London Madison-Plains Golden Eagles (2013-2017 to Ohio Heritage Conference)
 West Jefferson Roughriders (1949-1956, 2006-2017 to Ohio Heritage Conference)
 London Red Raiders (2013-2019, to Central Buckeye Conference)

Ohio Capital Conference

Conference realignment for 2020-21 thru 2023-24.Ohio Division Gahanna Lincoln Golden Lions (1968-)
 Grove City Greyhounds (1981-)
 New Albany Eagles (2006-)
 Pickerington North Panthers (2004-)
 Westerville Central Warhawks (2004-)
 Galloway Westland Cougars (1970-)Central Division Dublin Coffman Shamrocks (1991-)
 Hilliard Bradley Jaguars (2009-)
 Hilliard Davidson Wildcats (1974-)
 Powell Olentangy Liberty Patriots (2004-)
 Lewis Center Olentangy Orange Pioneers (2008-)
 Upper Arlington Golden Bears (1981-)Buckeye Division Grove City Central Crossing Comets (2002-)
 Groveport-Madison Cruisers (1974-)
 Lancaster Golden Gales (1997-)
 Newark Wildcats (1995-)
 Pickerington Central Tigers (1981-)
 Reynoldsburg Raiders (1968-)Cardinal Division Dublin Jerome Celtics (2004-)
 Hilliard Darby Panthers (1997-)
 Lewis Center Olentangy Braves (1997-)
 Delaware Olentangy Berlin Bears (2018-)
 Marysville Monarchs (1991-)
 Worthington Thomas Worthington Cardinals (1968-)Capital Division Sunbury Big Walnut Golden Eagles (1997-)
 Canal Winchester Indians (2013-)
 Delaware Hayes Pacers (1968-)
 Dublin Scioto Irish (1995-)
 Columbus Franklin Heights Falcons (1981-)
 Westerville North Warriors (1977-)
 Westerville South Wildcats (1968-)
 Columbus Worthington Kilbourne Wolves (1991-)Future Members Ashville Teays Valley Vikings (joining 2024)
 Logan Chieftains (joining 2024)Former Members Grove City Pleasant View Panthers (1968-1970). The school became a Junior High only. District built new school, Galloway Westland Cougars, to replace it.
 Whitehall-Yearling Rams (1968-2001). Now competing in the Mid-State League (Ohio Division).
 Chillicothe Cavaliers (1976–2006). Now competing in the Frontier Athletic Conference (FAC).
 Pataskala Watkins Memorial Warriors (1989-2013). Now competing in the Licking County League (LCL).
 Mount Vernon''' Yellow Jackets (1968-2016). Now competing in the Ohio Cardinal Conference.

Defunct conferences

See also
Ohio High School Athletic Association

Notes and references